Tarun Kona (born 17 November 1989) is an Indian badminton player. He entered the national team in 2006, and in 2011, he won the men's doubles title at the National Championships.

Achievements

BWF Grand Prix (1 runner-up) 
The BWF Grand Prix had two levels, the BWF Grand Prix and Grand Prix Gold. It was a series of badminton tournaments sanctioned by the Badminton World Federation (BWF) which was held from 2007 to 2017.

Mixed doubles

  BWF Grand Prix Gold tournament
  BWF Grand Prix tournament

BWF International Challenge/Series (12 titles, 11 runners-up) 
Men's doubles

Mixed doubles

  BWF International Challenge tournament
  BWF International Series tournament
  BWF Future Series tournament

References

External links 
 

Living people
1989 births
Racket sportspeople from Hyderabad, India
Indian male badminton players